Final cut or Final Cut may refer to:
 Final Cut, non-linear video editing software by Apple, Inc
 Final Cut Pro X, current version 
 Final Cut Pro, earlier version
 Final Cut Express, now discontinued
 Final Cut Server, now discontinued
 Final Cut Studio, a discontinued professional video and audio production suite
 "Final Cut" (Battlestar Galactica), a 2005 episode of Battlestar Galactica
 Final Cut (1980 film), an Australian film by Ross Dimsey
 Final Cut (1998 film), a British film starring Jude Law
 Final Cut (2022 film), a French zombie comedy film
 Final Cut (novel), a 2020 novel by S. J. Watson
 The Final Cut, a 1983 album by Pink Floyd
 The Final Cut (2004 film), a film starting Robin Williams
 Final Cut of Director, a 2016 Indian Hindi film
 Final cut privilege or final cut right, a film industry term, usually meaning the right of a director to final approval of any edits. 
 Final Cut, a novel featuring the Hardy Boys

See also 
 Director's cut
 The Final Cut (disambiguation)